The Square Circle Production is a well used magic trick on stage and also close up in smaller versions.

Effect: The magician shows a square box with a window in front and a coloured cylinder which fits in the box. When the tube is in the box, it can be seen through the window which normally has a grille or patterned lattice on it.

He starts by lifting both items onto a table which is raised off the ground (no trap doors) and then shows them empty both separately and together by lifting them off the table in turn, and looking right through the tube/box at the audience, putting his arm through and moving it around etc. When the tube is lifted out of the box, the black empty interior of the box can be seen through the grille. When the box is lifted off the tube, nothing can be seen hidden round the tube. Yet, when the tube is placed inside the box, he reaches in and produces all manner of items.

Magic tricks